Emarat Rezk (born September 16, 1985) is a Syrian TV actress. She has played many roles in popular TV series including Bab al-Hara 3, 4 and 5.

Life
Her real name is Emarat Mohammed Khier Abdulla Al-Sadi. She was born in Kafr Shams, Daraa Governorate, Syria. She married film director Youssef Rizk and they had one son in 2005. They have since divorced. 
She is now living in Damascus in Aburumana.

Emarat Rezk is one of the actresses on the Syrian screen advantages in terms of performance, representation and beauty, now she is getting married from Syrian singer Hussam Junaid.

References

1985 births
Living people
People from Daraa
Syrian television actresses
20th-century Syrian actresses
21st-century Syrian actresses
Syrian film actresses